Anoncia chordostoma is a moth in the family Cosmopterigidae. It was described by Edward Meyrick in 1912. It is found in Argentina.

References

Natural History Museum Lepidoptera generic names catalog

Moths described in 1912
Cosmopteriginae
Moths of South America